West Sumbawa Regency is a Regency (Kabupaten) of the Indonesian Province of West Nusa Tenggara. It is located on the island of Sumbawa and has an area of 1,742.27 km2. The regency was created on 18 December 2003 from what were at that time the westernmost five districts (kecamatan) of Sumbawa Regency. The population at the 2010 Census was 114,754, and at the 2020 Census was 145,798 - comprising 73,687 males and 72,111 females; the official estimate as at mid 2021 was 148,458. The capital is the town of Taliwang.

Poto Tano, the most important harbour of West Sumbawa, is easily accessible by ferry from Lombok.

Administrative Districts 
West Sumbawa Regency originally comprised five districts (kecamatan) formerly part of Sumbawa Regency, but now consists of eight districts, tabulated below with their areas and their populations at the 2010 Census and the 2020 Census, together with the official estimates as at mid 2021. The table also includes the locations of the district administrative centres, the number of administrative villages (rural desa and urban kelurahan) in each district, and its postal codes.

The 64 villages comprise 57 rural (desa) and 7 urban (kelurahan), the latter all in Taliwang District.

References 

 

Regencies of West Nusa Tenggara
Sumbawa